Janeway is a surname. Notable people with the surname include:

Carol Brown Janeway, British editor and translator of many novels
Charles Janeway (1943–2003), American immunologist
Charles Alderson Janeway (1909–1981), American pediatrician
Edward Gamaliel Janeway (1841–1911), American physician
Eliot Janeway (1913–1993), American economist
Elizabeth Janeway (1913–2005), American author
Gertrude Janeway (1909–2003), American widow of Civil War veteran
Harold Janeway (1937-2020), American politician
James Janeway (1636–1674), English author
Margaret Janeway (1896–1981), American military physician in World War II
Theodore Caldwell Janeway (1872–1917), American physician

Fictional characters
Kathryn Janeway, the main character in the television series Star Trek: Voyager

See also
Janeway Children's Health and Rehabilitation Centre, Canada
Janeway lesion, a type of skin lesion